Lost Ballast Island is an island in the U.S. state of Ohio, located in Lake Erie.  The island was once a part of Ballast Island, but was separated into a separate island by a strong storm. Historically, the island was not inhabited by humans, though it was a site for Nerodia sipedon insularum. Since the 1970's has sunk into Lake Erie to become a reef. During periods of low water the island reappears. It is located in Put-in-Bay Township, Ottawa County, Ohio.

References

Islands of Ottawa County, Ohio
Islands of Lake Erie in Ohio